Yuma Elementary School District 1 is a school district in Yuma County, Arizona.

External links
 

School districts in Yuma County, Arizona